Ian Cresswell is an Australian composer born in 1968. He obtained Bachelor of Music at the Australian National University in 1996 and Master of Music at the University of Queensland in 2002. Cresswell is currently doing postgraduate studies at the Conservatorium of Music at the University of Tasmania.

Cresswell has won a number of prizes for composition including the Harrold Allen Memorial Prize for Composition and the Australian-Franco composition competition for young composers. In 2003, Cresswell was one of the composers featured in an exhibition called The Thrill of the New. In 2004, his short piece Blood Lights (directed by Robert Jarman) made its debut at the University of Tasmania produced by the IHOS Music Theatre Laboratory. It featured projection and complex harmonies to portray the disintegration of a mind.

Footnotes

External links
Ian Cresswell page at the Tasmanian Composers Collective
IHOS Music Theatre and Opera
Australasian Performing Right Association

1968 births
Australian male classical composers
Australian National University alumni
Living people
Musicians from Tasmania
Australian opera composers
People from Hobart
University of Queensland alumni
University of Tasmania alumni